Transition or transitional may refer to:

Mathematics, science, and technology

Biology
 Transition (genetics), a point mutation that changes a purine nucleotide to another purine (A ↔ G) or a pyrimidine nucleotide to another pyrimidine (C ↔ T)
 Transitional fossil, any fossilized remains of a lifeform that exhibits the characteristics of two distinct taxonomic groups
 A phase during childbirth contractions during which the cervix completes its dilation

Gender and sex
 Gender transitioning, the process of changing one's gender presentation to accord with one's internal sense of one's gender – the idea of what it means to be a man or woman
 Sex reassignment therapy, the physical aspect of a gender transition

Physics
 Phase transition, a transformation of the state of matter; for example, the change between a solid and a liquid, between liquid and gas or between gas and plasma
 Quantum phase transition, a phase transformation between different quantum phases
 Quantum Hall transitions, a quantum phase transition that occurred because of the Quantum Hall Effect
 Transition radiation, contrasts to the Cherenkov radiation
 Atomic electron transition, the transition of an electron from one quantum state to another within an atom
 Beta decay transition, nuclear beta decay determined by changes in spin
 Laminar–turbulent transition, the process of a laminar fluid flow becoming turbulent
 Glass transition, the reversible transition in amorphous materials
 Lambda transition, universality class in condensed matter physics

Chemistry
 Transition metal, either an element whose atom has an incomplete d sub-shell, or any element in the d-block of the periodic table
 Transition state, of a chemical reaction is a particular configuration along the reaction coordinate
 SRM transition, the precursor and product ion pair in Selected reaction monitoring (SRM) in analytical chemistry

Computing
 A movement between states of an abstract computer, described by a transition system
 A phase of the project lifecycle in the Rational Unified Process
 A paradigm describing changes of communication mechanisms, see Transition (computer science)

Other uses in technology
 Transitions, a brand of photochromic eyeglass lens and sponsor of the PGA Tour Transitions Championship
 Transition (roadable aircraft), a flying car (or drivable airplane) made by Terrafugia
 "Shifting gears" on a railroad locomotive; see Diesel locomotive#Propulsion system operation

Government and politics
 transition management (governance)
 social change, often synonymous with social transition

Arts and entertainment

Literature

 Transition (fiction), a narrative element or general aspects of writing style that signal changes in a story
 Transition (linguistics), a certain word, expression, or other device that gives text or speech greater cohesion by making it more explicit

Works
 Transition (literary journal), an experimental literary journal that featured surrealist, expressionist, and Dada art and artists
 Transition (novel), a novel by Iain Banks
 Transitions (novel series), a novel series by R A Salvatore
 Transition Magazine, a political and literary journal published from 1961 to 1976 on the African continent, and revived in 1991 in the United States
 Transitions Online, Czech publisher of the Transitions news journal 
Transition, a novel by Vonda N. McIntyre 1990
 The Transition Weapons of Choice, the failed military experiment in John Birmingham's trilogy Axis of Time

Film, radio, and television
 Film transition, a method of juxtaposing two scenes, including:
 Wipe (transition), a type of film transition where one shot replaces another by travelling from one side of the frame to another or with a special shape
 Dissolve (filmmaking), a gradual transition from one image to another
 Transitions (film), the world's first IMAX film in 3D
 Transitions (radio show), a weekly two-hour radio show on Kiss 100 in the UK
 "Transitioning" (Glee), an episode of US television series Glee
 "Transitions" (Law & Order: Special Victims Unit episode), an episode of US television series Law & Order: Special Victims Unit
 "Transition" (The West Wing), an episode of US television series The West Wing
 "Transitions" (The Wire), an episode of US television series The Wire
 "Transitions", an episode of US television series Without a Trace

Music
 Transition (music), the middle passage of a piece of music
 Transition (band), English indie rock band 
 The Transitions, American R&B group

Albums
 Transition (John Coltrane album), 1970
 Transition (The First Edition album), 1971
 Transition (Buddy Rich Lionel Hampton album), 1974
 Transition (John Miles album), 1985
 Transition (Fly to the Sky album), 2006
 Transition (Ryan Leslie album), 2009
 Transition (Chipmunk album), 2011
 Transition (Steve Lukather album), 2013
 Transition (Nathan Stickman album), Nathan Stickman, 2016
 Transitions (John Digweed album), 2006
 Transitions (Aghora album), 2006
 Transitions (Westbound Train album), 2006
 Transitions (EP), 2010 by Canadian post-hardcore band Silverstein

Songs
 "Transition", by Pestilence from Obsideo, 2013
 "Transition", by Theatre Of Tragedy from Forever Is the World, 2009
 "The Transition", by Hawthorne Heights from The Silence in Black and White, 2004
 "Transitions", by Beastie Boys from Ill Communication, 1994
 "Transitions", by Zao from The Crimson Corridor, 2021

Other arts
 Transitional Style, of furniture and interior design

Politics 
 Peaceful transition of power a norm or practice in democratic governments, of transitions of power between different political parties.  
United States presidential transition, the transfer of federal executive branch power from the incumbent President of the United States to the president-elect.

Sport
 Transition (grappling), in grappling is a move from one grappling hold or grappling position to another
 Transitions Championship, a men's professional golf tournament on the PGA Tour

Other uses
 Transition Glacier, a glacier on the east coast of Alexander Island
 Care transition, wherein a patient changes health care provider

See also
 
 
 Change (philosophy), broadly synonymous 
 The Transition (disambiguation)
 Transition function (disambiguation)
 Fade (disambiguation)
 Gradient (disambiguation)